Dowqanlu (also Romanized as Dowqānlū; also known as Dowghānlū) is a village in Qareh Toghan Rural District, in the Central District of Neka County, Mazandaran Province, Iran. At the 2006 census, its population was 486, in 124 families.

References 

Populated places in Neka County